"Roamin' in the Gloamin' is a popular song written by Harry Lauder in 1911. The song tells of a man and his sweetheart wife courting in the evening (gloaming). The title comes from the chorus:

Roamin' in the gloamin' on the bonnie banks o' Clyde.
Roamin' in the gloamin' wae my lassie by my side. 
When the sun has gone to rest,
That's the time we love the best.

The song was a hit for Lauder in both his music hall shows and his 1912 recording. It has been recorded numerous times since, including an updated version  by Bing Crosby and Rosemary Clooney in their 1965 album That Travelin' Two-Beat.

In popular culture
Gabby Hartnett's clutch home run for Chicago Cubs late in the 1938 baseball season, when the game was at risk of being called on account of darkness, was dubbed the "Homer in the Gloamin'.

The song was sung by Harry Coombes (played by Art Carney) to his beloved cat Tonto as Tonto passes away near the end of Harry and Tonto (1974)

References

Bibliography
Lauder, Harry. "Roamin' In The Gloamin' (sheet music). New York: T.B. Harms & Francis Day & Hunter (1911).
Szasz, Ferenc Morton. Scots in the North American West, 1790-1917. Norman, OK: University of Oklahoma Press (2000).

Scottish songs
1911 songs
Songs written by Harry Lauder